Derek Harris may refer to:

 Dr Derek Harris, the founder of Aston Science Park
 Derek Devlen Harris (1926–1998), actor better known as John Derek